Kushkak (also Romanized as Kūshkak and Kooshkak; also known as Kuckak and Kūshgak) is a village in Jannat Makan Rural District, in the Central District of Gotvand County, Khuzestan Province, Iran. At the 2006 census, its population was 1,042, in 201 families.

References 

Populated places in Gotvand County